In Western classical music tradition,  (plural  ; , plural) is a term for setting poetry to classical music to create a piece of polyphonic music. The term is used for any kind of song in contemporary German, but among English and French speakers,  is often used interchangeably with "art song" to encompass works that the tradition has inspired in other languages as well. The poems that have been made into lieder often center on pastoral themes or themes of romantic love.

It later came especially to refer to settings of Romantic poetry during the late eighteenth and nineteenth centuries, and into the early twentieth century. Examples include settings by Joseph Haydn, Wolfgang Amadeus Mozart, Ludwig van Beethoven, Franz Schubert, Robert Schumann, Johannes Brahms, Hugo Wolf, Gustav Mahler or Richard Strauss.

History 

For German speakers, the term "Lied" has a long history ranging from twelfth-century troubadour songs via folk songs and church hymns to twentieth-century workers' songs or protest songs.

The German word Lied for "song" (cognate with the English dialectal leed) first came into general use in German during the early fifteenth century, largely displacing the earlier word gesang. The poet and composer Oswald von Wolkenstein is sometimes claimed to be the creator of the lied because of his innovations in combining words and music. The late-fourteenth-century composer known as the Monk of Salzburg wrote six two-part lieder which are older still, but Oswald's songs (about half of which actually borrow their music from other composers) far surpass the Monk of Salzburg in both number (about 120 lieder) and quality. From the 15th century come three large song collections compiled in Germany: the Lochamer Liederbuch, the Schedelsches Liederbuch, and the Glogauer Liederbuch. 

The scholar Konrad Celtis (1459 – 1508), the Arch-Humanist of German Renaissance, taught his students to compose Latin poems using the metric patterns following the model of the Horatian odes. These poems were subsequently "set to simple, four-part music, incorporate the shifting accenmal patterns of the French vers mesurée". The composers of this style included Heinrich Finck, Paul Hofhaimer, and Ludwig Senfl. The style also became imbued into the new German humanist dramas, thus contributing to the development of Protestanthymnody. The style is present in the earliest German secular polyphony collections such as Johann Ott'S Mehrstimmiges Deutsches Liederbuch (1534) and Georg Forster’s Frisclw tentsche Lieder (about 1540 onwards). According to Chester Lee Alwes, Heinrich Isaac's popular song Innsbruck, ich muss dich lassen "became the gold standard of the Lied genre".

In Germany, the great age of song came in the nineteenth century. German and Austrian composers had written music for voice with keyboard before this time, but it was with the flowering of German literature in the Classical and Romantic eras that composers found inspiration in poetry that sparked the genre known as the lied. The beginnings of this tradition are seen in the songs of Haydn, Mozart and Beethoven, but it was with Schubert that a new balance was found between words and music, a new expression of the sense of the words in and through the music. Schubert wrote over 600 songs, some of them in sequences or song cycles that relate an adventure of the soul rather than the body. The tradition was continued by Schumann, Brahms, and Wolf, and on into the 20th century by Richard Strauss, Mahler, and Pfitzner. Composers of atonal music, such as Arnold Schoenberg, Alban Berg and Anton Webern, also composed lieder.

Examples
Typically, Lieder are arranged for a single singer and piano, Lieder with orchestral accompaniment being a later development. Some of the most famous examples of Lieder are Schubert's Erlkönig, Der Tod und das Mädchen ("Death and the Maiden"), Gretchen am Spinnrade, and Der Doppelgänger. Sometimes, lieder are composed in a song cycle (German  or Liederkreis), a series of songs (generally three or more) tied by a single narrative or theme, such as Schubert's Die schöne Müllerin and Winterreise, or Robert Schumann's Frauen-Liebe und Leben and Dichterliebe. Schubert and Schumann are most closely associated with this genre, mainly developed in the Romantic era.

Other national traditions 
The Lied tradition is closely linked with the German language, but there are parallels elsewhere, notably in France, with the mélodies of such composers as Berlioz, Fauré, Debussy, and Poulenc, and in Russia, with the songs of Mussorgsky and Rachmaninoff in particular. England too had a flowering of song, more closely associated, however, with folk songs than with art songs, as represented by Ralph Vaughan Williams, Benjamin Britten, Ivor Gurney, and Gerald Finzi.

References

Further reading
 
 
 Lieder line by line

External links 

 The LiederNet Archive, texts and translations
 The Lieder Sound Archive
 The OpenScore Lieder Corpus, public domain transcriptions to play or download
 The Art Song Project
 "Life On the Other Side – 1971 Darüber...", Aubrey Pankey, an African-American lieder singer

 
German music history
Romantic music
Romanticism
Song forms
 
Medieval music genres